Downpatrick was a constituency represented in the Irish House of Commons until 1800.

History
In the Patriot Parliament of 1689 summoned by James II, Downpatrick was not represented.

Members of Parliament, 1586–1801
1613-1615: Richard Wingfield, 1st Viscount Powerscourt and Richard West
1634–1635: Edward Kynaston (died 1634) and William Billingsly
1639–1649: Mark Trevor and William Billingsly
1661–1666: Nicholas Ward and Daniel O'Neill

1689–1801

Notes

References

Bibliography

Constituencies of the Parliament of Ireland (pre-1801)
Downpatrick
Historic constituencies in County Down
1586 establishments in Ireland
1800 disestablishments in Ireland
Constituencies established in 1586
Constituencies disestablished in 1800